Har Har Mahadev is a 2022 Indian Marathi-language epic historical action drama film written and directed by Abhijeet Deshpande and produced by Zee Studios along with Sunil Phadtare under the banner of Shree Ganesh Marketing And Films. It stars Subodh Bhave as Chatrapati Shivaji Maharaj and Sharad Kelkar as Baji Prabhu Deshpande in lead while Amruta Khanvilkar, Nishigandha Wad, Sayali Sanjeev, Hardeek Joshi, Milind Shinde, Kishore Kadam, Nitish Chavan and Ashok Shinde plays important supporting roles. The film is about the inspiring story of Baji Prabhu Deshpande, a general of Chhatrapati Shivaji Maharaj who, along with his army of 300 soldiers, fought against 12,000 Bijapuri soldiers. The film was released theatrically on 25 October 2022 and digitally in Hindi on 8 December 2022 on ZEE5.

Upon release, Har Har Mahadev received positive reviews from critics and audiences for Deshpande's direction, cast performance (particularly Kelkar and Bhave), writing, cinematography, visual effects, and emotional weight, and became a commercial success; it grossed ₹25 crore (US$3.1 million) worldwide becoming 4th highest-grossing film of the year.

Synopsis
The film is about the inspirational story of a real battle in which only 300 soldiers, led by Baji Prabhu Deshpande, the commander of Chhatrapati Shivaji Maharaj fought against 12,000 Bijapuri soldiers in Battle of Pavan Khind.

Cast

Soundtrack

The music of the film is composed by Hitesh Modak and lyrics are written by Mangesh Kangane and Mandar Cholkar.

Marketing and release
The teaser of the film was released on 4 March 2022, which included a voice-over given by Raj Thackeray. The trailer of the film was released on 10 October 2022 and received 5 million views in less than 24 hours on YouTube.

The film was released theatrically on 25 October 2022. It also became the first Marathi film to be released in Hindi, Tamil, Telugu and Kannada languages.

Reception 
Har Har Mahadev met with critical acclaim, with emphasis on the direction, the cast's performance, cinematography, visual effects, and emotional weight.

Subhash K Jha of IWM Buzz gave 4 out of 5 stars and wrote, “Go for this disarming tryst with history with open arms. It is an experience of a lifetime. Powerful and persuasive , with some sequences designed to cause goosebumps.” Shalmesh More of Koimoi.com rated the film 3.5 out of 5 stars and wrote “Har Har Mahadev is driven by a story that has already been told but still deserves your watch on the big screen due to its emotional treatment. It's more than a war drama!” Mihir Bhanage of The Times of India gave the film 3 out of 5 stars and said, “The film succeeds in creating a big-screen spectacle, but the repeat value in the story dampens the spirit.”

Shaheen Irani of OTTplay rated 3 out of 5 stars and wrote, “Har Har Mahadev is a cinematic brilliance in the last hour of the film. Up to that point, you are only trying to figure out where the story is headed and where will it lead to. Even then, although the visuals are beyond appealing, the music is not.” Mayur Sanap of Rediff.com calls it a “emotionally-charged war drama” and appreciated the cast. Overall he wrote “Har Har Mahadev is not without flaws and had the potential for much more. But credit to Director Deshpande for attempting to make the tale layered and emotionally moving.” with rating of 2.5 out of 5 stars. Sameer Ahire of Movie Talkies criticised direction but appreciated Kelkar, Khanvilkar, and Sanjeev's performance and wrote, “Sharad Kelkar's Electrifying Act Saves The Mediocre Vision Of Abhijeet Deshpande In This Legendary Tale.” gave 2.5 stars out of 5. Likewise, Film Information gave positive reviews, noting Deshpande's impactful direction, dialogues, Sadineni's camerawork but criticised the editing.

Controversy 
Following the release of the trailer, the movie generated controversy. The Bandal descendants objected to the trailer and submitted a detailed complaint letter two days before the movie's premiere, alleging that the movie is based on a false history. Within a week after the film's release, Amol Mitkari of the Nationalist Congress Party and politician Sambhaji Raje, the 13th direct descendant of Chhatrapati Shivaji Maharaj, and their outfit Swarajya Sanghatan criticized it as misleading historical revisionism. On 7 November 2022, MLA Jitendra Awad and NCP workers shut down the film's screening in Thane's Viviana Mall. A fan was also assaulted by an activists. The film's director clarified his position on this matter during a press conference, stating that the film is based on historical sources and has been submitted to the Censor Board.

Accolades

References

External links
 
 Har Har Mahadev on ZEE5

2022 films
Indian historical drama films
2020s historical drama films
Films set in the Maratha Empire
2022 drama films
2020s Marathi-language films